Selayar or Selayarese is a Malayo-Polynesian language spoken by about 100,000 people on the island of Selayar in South Sulawesi province, Indonesia.

Phonology

Vowels

Vowels are lengthened when stressed and in an open syllable.

Nasalization
Nasalization extends from nasal consonants to the following vowels, continuing until blocked by an intonation break or a consonant other than a glottal stop:
 "A dog urinated on him."
 "A lizard urinated on him, and a dog defecated on him."

Consonants

Of the coronals, the voiceless stop is dental, while the others are alveolar.

Morphology
Selayarese intransitive verbs index pronominal arguments via an absolutive enclitic.

In transitive verbs the less agent-like argument is indexed by the absolutive enclitic.

References

South Sulawesi languages
Languages of Sulawesi
South Sulawesi